Drummond is a town in Bayfield County, Wisconsin, United States. The population was 169 at the 2020 census, down from 463 at the 2010 census. The census-designated place of Drummond is located in the town. The unincorporated community of Lake Owen is also located in the town.

Transportation
U.S. Highway 63 serves as a main route in the community.

Geography

Demographics
As of the census of 2000, there were 541 people, 231 households, and 155 families residing in the town. The population density was 3.9 people per square mile (1.5/km2). There were 645 housing units at an average density of 4.7 per square mile (1.8/km2). The racial makeup of the town was 98.34% White, 0.92% Native American, and 0.74% from two or more races. Hispanic or Latino of any race were 1.11% of the population.

There were 231 households, out of which 26.0% had children under the age of 18 living with them, 59.3% were married couples living together, 4.3% had a female householder with no husband present, and 32.5% were non-families. 28.6% of all households were made up of individuals, and 18.6% had someone living alone who was 65 years of age or older. The average household size was 2.34 and the average family size was 2.83.

In the town, the population was spread out, with 23.1% under the age of 18, 4.6% from 18 to 24, 24.0% from 25 to 44, 26.4% from 45 to 64, and 21.8% who were 65 years of age or older. The median age was 44 years. For every 100 females, there were 92.5 males. For every 100 females age 18 and over, there were 98.1 males.

The median income for a household in the town was $37,500, and the median income for a family was $41,544. Males had a median income of $31,827 versus $16,875 for females. The per capita income for the town was $16,773. About 8.3% of families and 12.4% of the population were below the poverty line, including 12.0% of those under age 18 and 18.2% of those age 65 or over.

Education
Drummond High School is the town's high school.

References

External links
Town of Drummond official website
 Drummond Visitors Guide

Towns in Bayfield County, Wisconsin
Towns in Wisconsin